PodProperty is an online legal service provider, that specializes in co-ownership agreements for tenants in common. The company’s business model and value proposition is to be viewed and positioned as “a pioneer” in the home co-ownership industry.

History
Jeremy Levitt and Jonathan Stambolis co-founded PodProperty in April 2006. Stambolis is a director of PodProperty, and Levitt is the company's chief executive officer (CEO). The business is built around the legal arrangement of co-ownership of houses, apartments or real estate in Australia. The company was established during Australia's housing affordability crisis when there was soaring property prices and rising interest rates on home mortgages.
 
It was reported in November 2006 (six months after PodProperty was established) that the company was receiving 30-40 enquiries a day for its co-ownership guide. In June 2007, PodProperty made a submission to the New Zealand Parliament Commerce Select Committee Inquiry into Housing Affordability in New Zealand. Its submission "focuses on shared equity schemes and, in particular, co-ownership as a means of improving the affordability of housing in New Zealand, based on the success of this initiative in Australia". The company said in a report in February 2010 that the estimated number of people it has assisted with their co-ownership plans grew 51 per cent year on year and it attributed the growth to the effects of the global financial crisis and people wanting to spread their mortgage risk.

Services and products
PodProperty arranges co-ownership agreements and letters of legal advice for people who want to buy property together as tenants in common. The PodProperty Co-Ownership Agreement can set out the rights and obligations between people in many different types of relationships, including groups of friends, family members, de facto partners (either heterosexual or same-sex) or a combination of these types of relationships, and it can be used to set out how the co-owners want to deal with any other issues relating to the property. The company has a co-ownership guide for home buyers and real estate investors, which explains how co-ownership works, its importance and how to start or end a co-ownership.

The PodProperty Co-Ownership Guide is given out for free. The company also provides a service to help home owners and real estate investors sell down part of their investments. It charges for co-ownership agreements, and would be co-owners pay on a "per person" basis for this service.

Affiliations
PodProperty has a strategic partnership with the Commonwealth Bank of Australia (CBA) and Mortgage Choice which has PodProperty listed as their preferred source of co-ownership agreements. It launched a co-ownership initiative with the now defunct Wizard Home Loans in 2007 to provide specialised services for single first home buyers looking to purchase property together.

In 2007, PodProperty organised the co-ownership of a holiday property in Queensland involving five Australian couples living in Indonesia, the Northern Territory and Victoria and assisted another group to buy in Niseko, Japan. They arranged a co-ownership agreement for two friends who pooled their deposits to buy an apartment in Surry Hills, New South Wales in 2008. The company also assisted a brother and sister in 2008 to buy an apartment in Sydney's North Bondi and helped them to look for a second one too. In 2013, PodProperty drew up a co-ownership agreement for the sales of a five-bedroom house in Cottage Point, New South Wales waterfront on Sydney's Pittwater.

Recognistions
The company's chief executive officer (CEO), Jeremy Levitt, was nominated as a 2007 SmartCompany Idol.

See also
 Property law
 Concurrent estate

References

External links
 Official website

Law firms of Australia
Internet properties established in 2006
Real estate companies of Australia
Online legal services
2006 establishments in Australia